Hydnellum underwoodii is an inedible species of tooth fungus in the family Bankeraceae. Found in North America, it was described as new to science in 1906 by American mycologist Howard James Banker. Its reddish-brown, convex to flattened cap measures  in diameter. Reddish-brown, partially erect scales adorn the cap surface. Spines on the cap underside are 1–3 mm long; they are initially white, becoming brown with grayish tips in age. The oval to spherical spores are 6–7.5 by 5.5–6.5 µm. The fungus fruits singly or scattered, on the ground in coniferous forests.

References

External links
 
 

Fungi described in 1906
Fungi of North America
Inedible fungi
underwoodii